Susan Roberts (born 21 April 1939 in Johannesburg) is a South African former swimmer who competed in the 1956 Summer Olympics.

References

1939 births
Living people
Swimmers from Johannesburg
South African female swimmers
South African female freestyle swimmers
Olympic swimmers of South Africa
Swimmers at the 1956 Summer Olympics
Olympic bronze medalists for South Africa
Olympic bronze medalists in swimming
Medalists at the 1956 Summer Olympics
Swimmers at the 1958 British Empire and Commonwealth Games
Commonwealth Games competitors for South Africa
20th-century South African women
21st-century South African women